The Wisconsin State Golf Association (WSGA) is a 501(c)6 organization comprising member golf clubs and individual golfing members located in the state of Wisconsin. The WSGA is directed by a statewide Board of Directors, while the daily affairs are managed by a full-time executive director and an administrative staff.

History

Tournaments 
The WSGA annually conducts 14 tournaments and championships for players of various skill levels. 
 Wisconsin State Amateur Championship
 Match Play Championship
 Bestball (Four-Ball) Championship
 Junior Boys Championship
 Pater-Filius (Father-Son) Championship
 Mid-Amateur Championship
 Net Amateur Championship
 2-Man Team Championship
 Senior Amateur Championship
 Senior Match Play Championship
 Senior Bestball (Four-Ball) Championship
 Senior 2-Man Team Championship
 Net Partners Series and Championship
 Senior Tour and Championship

Wisconsin Golf Hall of Fame

Notes

Golf in Wisconsin
Golf associations